Record Management Services (RMS) are procedures in the VMS, RSTS/E, RT-11 and RSX-11M operating systems that programs may call to process files and records within files. Its file formats and procedures are similar to of those in some IBM access methods for several of its mainframe computer operating systems and by other vendors for file and record management. VMS RMS is an integral part of the system software; its procedures run in executive mode. (RMS was not initially integrated into RT-11 and RSTS/E, but was available as an added charge "layered product". It was later added to RSTS/E and was a part of its standard documentation set.)

RMS supports four record access methods:
 Sequential Access
 Relative Record Number Access
 Record File Address Access
 Indexed Access

RMS supports four record formats:
 Fixed length
 Variable length
 Variable record length with fixed-length control blocks
 Stream files (records separated by termination characters)
 STREAM: Records terminated by CRLF
 STREAM_CR: Records terminated by CR
 STREAM_LF: Records terminated by LF

Digital provided the File Definition Language (FDL) which could be used to define the structure of an RMS file.

Notes

References

External links
 Guide to OpenVMS File Applications
 OpenVMS Record Management Services Reference Manual
 Free BASIC demo programs showing how to use RMS

OpenVMS software
Digital Equipment Corporation